Fernando San Emeterio Lara (born 1 January 1984) is a Spanish professional basketball coach and former player. He is currently working as an assistant coach for Valencia of the Spanish Liga ACB and the EuroLeague.

He was an All-EuroLeague First Team selection in 2011, as well as the ACB MVP the same year.

Professional career
San Emeterio began his professional career with Valladolid, during the 2001–02 season. In 2006, he joined Girona. In 2008, he moved to Baskonia. He was named the ACB MVP in 2011. In 2011, he signed a new four-year contract extension with Baskonia. On 30 June 2015, he parted ways with Baskonia. On 8 July 2015, he signed a two-year contract with Valencia Basket. San Emeterio signed a contract extension on 13 July 2020.

Retirement
On 1 July 2021 San Emeterio announced his retirement from professional basketball.

Coaching career
Following retirement, he has started his coaching career by becoming assistant coach for Valencia Basket of the Spanish Liga ACB.

Spain national team
San Emeterio was a part of the Spain national team that won the bronze medal at the 2005 Mediterranean Games. He also was a member of the senior men's Spain national team that participated at the 2010 FIBA World Championship, and won the gold medal at the EuroBasket 2011. He also won the silver medal at the 2012 Summer Olympics, the bronze medal at the EuroBasket 2013, and the gold medal at the EuroBasket 2015.

Career statistics

EuroLeague

|-
| style="text-align:left;"| 2008–09
| style="text-align:left;"| Baskonia
| 20 || 4 || 11.0 || .403 || .286 || .882 || 1.8 || .6 || .3 || .1 || 3.5 || 3.0
|-
| style="text-align:left;"| 2009–10
| style="text-align:left;"| Baskonia
| 20 || 18 || 27.9 || .484 || .426 || .800 || 3.8 || 2.3 || .8 || .0 || 11.8 || 14.1
|-
| style="text-align:left;"| 2010–11
| style="text-align:left;"| Baskonia
| 20 || 20 || 33.8 || .569 || style="background:#CFECEC;"|.500 || .771 || 5.5 || 2.4 || .8 || .1 || 13.7 || style="background:#CFECEC;"| 19.1
|-
| style="text-align:left;"| 2011–12
| style="text-align:left;"| Baskonia
| 10 || 5 || 28.1 || .472 || .343 || .960 || 4.6 || 2.1 || .8 || .0 || 12.0 || 13.4
|-
| style="text-align:left;"| 2012–13
| style="text-align:left;"| Baskonia
| 28 || 9 || 24.3 || .464 || .338 || .772 || 3.3 || 2.1 || .5 || .0 || 9.0 || 10.1
|-
| style="text-align:left;"| 2013–14
| style="text-align:left;"| Baskonia
| 21 || 21 || 26.7 || .496 || .435 || .793 || 2.8 || 2.0 || .3 || .0 || 9.3 || 9.2
|-
| style="text-align:left;"| 2014–15
| style="text-align:left;"| Baskonia
| 24 || 7 || 23.2 || .421 || .319 || .797 || 3.0 || 1.8 || .5 || .0 || 10.3 || 10.3
|- class="sortbottom"
!  colspan=2 | Career
| 143 || 84 || 24.7 || .481 || .384 || .805 || 3.4 || 1.9 || .5 || .0 || 9.8 || 11.0

Awards and accomplishments

Professional career
FIBA EuroCup: 2006–07,2018–19
Spanish King's Cup: 2009
Spanish Super Cup: 2008,2018
2× Spanish ACB League: 2009–10, 2016–17

Individual awards
All-EuroLeague First Team: 2010–11
All-Liga ACB Team: 2010–11
ACB MVP: 2010–11
All-EuroCup Second Team: 2016–17

Spain national team
2005 Mediterranean Games: 
EuroBasket 2011: 
2012 Summer Olympics: 
EuroBasket 2013: 
EuroBasket 2015: 
EuroBasket 2017:

References

External links
Fernando San Emeterio at acb.com 
Fernando San Emeterio at eurobasket.com
Fernando San Emeterio at euroleague.net
Fernando San Emeterio at fiba.com (archive)
Fernando San Emeterio at fibaeurope.com

1984 births
Living people
2010 FIBA World Championship players
Basketball players at the 2012 Summer Olympics
Basketball players from Cantabria
CB Girona players
CB Valladolid players
Competitors at the 2005 Mediterranean Games
FIBA EuroBasket-winning players
Liga ACB players
Medalists at the 2012 Summer Olympics
Mediterranean Games bronze medalists for Spain
Mediterranean Games medalists in basketball
Olympic basketball players of Spain
Olympic medalists in basketball
Olympic silver medalists for Spain
Saski Baskonia players
Shooting guards
Small forwards
Spanish men's basketball players
Sportspeople from Santander, Spain
Valencia Basket players